Samuel Akinde (born 14 April 1993) is an English semi-professional footballer who plays as a striker.

Career
Akinde spent his early career in non-league football with Kettering Town, Ebbsfleet United, Alfreton Town, Dover Athletic, Kingstonian, Hereford United, Welling United, Basingstoke Town and St Albans City.

He signed for Alfreton in September 2013, and was released by the club in February 2014 after making five appearances. He moved to Dover Athletic in March 2014, then Kingstonian, making five appearances in April 2014. In October 2014 he was sent off for fighting while playing for Hereford.

He signed for Basingstoke Town in August 2015, and played for St Albans City between October and December 2015.

Akinde played several games on trial for Barnet's under-23 side throughout the 2016–17 season, and signed a one-year deal on 3 March 2017. He made his English Football League debut as a substitute against Wycombe Wanderers on 17 April 2017. Akinde was released by the Bees at the end of the 2016–17 season. He signed for Hemel Hempstead Town in October 2017. Akinde joined Margate in August 2018. In November 2019, Akinde joined Tonbridge Angels. The following month, he joined Bedford Town on dual registration. Akinde joined Wingate & Finchley in October 2020.

Personal life
Akinde was born in England and is of Nigerian descent. His brother John is also a professional footballer.

References

1993 births
Living people
English footballers
English sportspeople of Nigerian descent
Black British sportspeople
Kettering Town F.C. players
Ebbsfleet United F.C. players
Alfreton Town F.C. players
Dover Athletic F.C. players
Kingstonian F.C. players
Hereford United F.C. players
Welling United F.C. players
Basingstoke Town F.C. players
St Albans City F.C. players
Barnet F.C. players
Hemel Hempstead Town F.C. players
Margate F.C. players
Tonbridge Angels F.C. players
Bedford Town F.C. players
Wingate & Finchley F.C. players
English Football League players
National League (English football) players
Isthmian League players
Southern Football League players
Association football forwards